Crooked Lake is a State registered Outstanding Florida Water that is located in southeast Polk County, Florida, United States. The lake is located west of Babson Park, north and west of Hillcrest Heights and east of Crooked Lake Park. Webber International University is beached on the waterfront. Originally known as Caloosa Lake by the Indians, it is located on the Lake Wales Ridge, one of the highest areas in peninsula Florida.

References

Lakes of Polk County, Florida